Ridin' the Lone Trail is a 1937 American Western film directed by Sam Newfield, written by Charles F. Royal, and starring Bob Steele, Claire Rochelle, Charles King, Ernie Adams, Lew Meehan and Julian Rivero. The film was released on September 1, 1937, by Republic Pictures.

Plot
The plot follows marshal Bob McArthur as he investigates a train hijacking gang led by an outlaw with a beautiful white horse.

Cast 
Bob Steele as Bob McArthur
Claire Rochelle as Joan Randall
Charles King as Dusty Williams
Ernie Adams as Peters
Lew Meehan as Henchman Sparks
Julian Rivero as Henchman Pedro
Steve Clark as Sheriff Carson
Hal Price as Furman
Frank Ball as Randall

References

External links
 

1937 films
American Western (genre) films
1937 Western (genre) films
Republic Pictures films
Films directed by Sam Newfield
American black-and-white films
1930s English-language films
1930s American films